A New Athens, first published in 1977, is the sixth novel by Canadian author Hugh Hood and the second in his 12-novel cycle, The New Age.

Setting
The book is set in southeastern Ontario, Canada in 1966. Much of the story takes place in the form of reminiscences of the late 1940s and 1950s.

Story
Narrator Matt Goderich, now approaching middle age, has become an art historian. As the novel opens, he is wandering along the back roads of eastern Ontario, contemplating the flora, the history of trains in the region, and decades past.
He relates his time as a young student, beginning in 1948, where he is a rare Catholic at the overwhelmingly Protestant Victoria University in the University of Toronto. After a fleeting first romance he meets his future wife Edie, who disappoints her family by converting to Catholicism to marry him. The young couple spends time in her hometown of Stoverville (a fictionalized version of Brockville), where her parents have a boathouse on the Saint Lawrence River. Her father is a well-known politician, and her mother is a brilliant but undiscovered painter. The 'new Athens' of the title is a reference to the town of Athens, Ontario.

1977 Canadian novels
Novels by Hugh Hood
Novels set in Ontario
Fiction set in 1966